In mathematical physics, the almost Mathieu operator arises in the study of the quantum Hall effect. It is given by
 

acting as a self-adjoint operator on the Hilbert space . Here  are parameters. In pure mathematics, its importance comes from the fact of being one of the best-understood examples of an ergodic Schrödinger operator.  For example, three problems (now all solved) of Barry Simon's fifteen problems about Schrödinger operators "for the twenty-first century" featured the almost Mathieu operator. In physics, the almost Mathieu operators can be used to study metal to insulator transitions like in the Aubry–André model.

For , the almost Mathieu operator is sometimes called Harper's equation.

The spectral type
If  is a rational number, then 
is a periodic operator and by Floquet theory its spectrum is purely absolutely continuous.

Now to the case when  is irrational.
It is now known, that
For ,  has surely purely absolutely continuous spectrum. (This was one of Simon's problems.)
For ,  has   surely purely singular continuous spectrum for any irrational .
For ,  has almost surely pure point spectrum and exhibits Anderson localization. (It is known that almost surely can not be replaced by surely.)

That the spectral measures are singular when  follows (through the work of Yoram Last and Simon)

from the lower bound on the Lyapunov exponent  given by
 

This lower bound was proved independently by Joseph Avron, Simon and Michael Herman, after an earlier almost rigorous argument of Serge Aubry and Gilles André.  In fact, when  belongs to the spectrum, the inequality becomes an equality (the Aubry–André formula), proved by Jean Bourgain and Svetlana Jitomirskaya.

The structure of the spectrum

This was shown by Avila and Jitomirskaya solving the by-then famous "ten martini problem" (also one of Simon's problems) after several earlier results (including generically and almost surely with respect to the parameters).

Furthermore, the Lebesgue measure of the spectrum of the almost Mathieu operator is known to be
 

for all . For  this means that the spectrum has zero measure (this was first proposed by Douglas Hofstadter and later became one of Simon's problems). For , the formula was discovered numerically by Aubry and André and proved by Jitomirskaya and Krasovsky. Earlier Last  had proven this formula for most values of the parameters.

The study of the spectrum for  leads to the Hofstadter's butterfly, where the spectrum is shown as a set.

References

Spectral theory
Mathematical physics